Nagamine (written: 長峯, 長嶺 or 永峰) is a Japanese surname. Notable people with the surname include:

, Japanese footballer
, Japanese footballer
, Japanese archer
, Japanese writer, soldier, police officer and karateka
, Japanese karateka
, Japanese anime director

See also
, a railway station in Aomori Prefecture, Japan
, a mountain in Hyōgo Prefecture, Japan

Japanese-language surnames